Events in the year 1995 in Namibia.

Incumbents 

 President: Sam Nujoma
 Prime Minister: Hage Geingob
 Chief Justice of Namibia: Ismael Mahomed

Events 

 12 May – Miss Universe 1995, the 44th Miss Universe pageant, was held at the Windhoek Country Club Resort in Windhoek.

Deaths

References 

 
1990s in Namibia
Years of the 20th century in Namibia
Namibia
Namibia